Doctor of Metaphysics (PhD, Ph.D., or DMETA; Latin:  or doctor Metaphysica), also called a Metaphysical Science Doctorate,  is a purported academic degree. While academic universities may teach Metaphysics as a branch of Philosophy, the Doctor of Metaphysics degree is a non-secular (religious based) degree. It is a real, legal degree, but is not federally recognized as an academic degree.

Metaphysics 
The study of metaphysics is centered on spiritual (not necessarily religious) matters and positive thinking. The derivation of the word metaphysics comes from the greek: meta - over and beyond and physics. The Department of Philosophy at the University of Georgia defines metaphysics as a branch of philosophy concerned with reality and potentiality, mind and matter.

Doctorate of Metaphysics 
In the United States, a Doctor of Metaphysics degree may be offered by purported religious institutions of learning, "so called" churches and colleges of metaphysics. In 1938 the United States Department of the Interior published a book listing the "Doctor of Metaphysics" degree in a section written by Walton C. John, titled "Counterfeit Degrees". 

A 1960 American Psychologist article titled, "Mail-order training in psychotherapy," warned against unaccredited schools purporting to offer "training in a variety of psychological and metapsychological methods" and awarding a Doctor of Metaphysics degree. 

In the field of social work there are counselors who claim the title "Doctor of Metaphysics". In 2019 the Journal of Social Work Education published, "Predatory Doctoral Programs: Warnings for Social Workers". The article warned that the majority of doctoral programs in metaphysics are little more than diploma mills which require few prerequisites other than money.

See also
 Degrees offered by unaccredited institutions of higher education
 History of higher education in the United States
 List of fields of doctoral studies in the United States
 List of unaccredited institutions of higher education

References

Titles
Degrees offered by unaccredited institutions of higher education